José Inés Lomelí López (born 26 February 1994) is a Mexican footballer who plays as a midfielder for UdeG.

References

1994 births
Living people
Mexican footballers
Association football midfielders
Leones Negros UdeG footballers
Inter Playa del Carmen players
Ascenso MX players
Liga Premier de México players
Tercera División de México players
Footballers from Guadalajara, Jalisco